The Khlong Saen Saep boat service is a water bus operating on the Saen Saep Canal in Bangkok through the city's commercial districts. The Khlong Saen Saep boat service has been in operation since 1990.

The 18 kilometre route is served by 100 boats of 40-50 seats. It operates from 05:30 to 20:30 daily on weekdays (to 19:00 on weekends). Prices are 8-20 baht, depending on distance traveled. The service carries about 60,000 passengers per day. It is run by a company called Family Transport.

In 2022, an extension of the old route was started. 12 new electric boats work on the route from Wat Sriboonreung to Minburi district office. The extension follows a different timetable and more modern boats.

Route
The service runs between Pom Prap Sattru Phai and Bang Kapi Districts in Bangkok. The Pratu Nam pier in the Pathum Wan-Ratchathewi Districts is a transfer station where passengers change between the western line, which ends at Golden Mount, and the eastern line, which ends at the National Institute of Development Administration (NIDA). Boats pass the Watthana and Huai Khwang Districts, running parallel to Phetburi Road.

Golden Mount Line
Panfa Leelard - terminal, near Golden Mount and other attractions.
Talad Bobae - garment market.
Sapan Charoenpol
Baan Krua Nua
Sapan Hua Chang - near Bangkok Art and Culture Centre, MBK Center and BTS skytrain National Stadium station and Siam station, and closest to BTS skytrain Ratchathewi station.
Pratunam - interchange, near Pratunam garment district, CentralWorld and Pantip Plaza.

NIDA Line

Pratunam - interchange, near Pratunam garment district, CentralWorld and Pantip Plaza.
Chidlom - near Central Chidlom.
Wireless - at Witthayu Road near  the old site of British Embassy.
Nana Nua (Sukhumvit Soi 3) - near Bumrungrad Hospital, "Little Africa" neighborhood.
Nana Chard (Sukhumvit Soi 15)
Asoke-Petchaburi - near MRT Phetchaburi station and the old site of Embassy of Japan.
Prasanmit - at Srinakharinwirot University (Prasarn Mitr Campus).
Italthai - at Italthai Tower
Wat Mai Chonglom - near Royal City Avenue (RCA).
Baan Don Mosque
Soi Thonglor - street with many boutique shopping malls.
Charn Issara - at Charn Issara 2 Building near Khlong Tan railway station and entrance of Ekkamai road (Sukhumvit Soi 63).
Vijit School
Sapan Klongtun - near busy intersection of Petchaburi, Ramkhamhaeng, Pridi Banomyong (Sukhumvit Soi 71) and Phatthanakan roads, with BTS skytrain shuttle-bus service.
The Mall Ram 3 - The Mall Ramkhamhaeng, near Rama IX Road intersection.
Wat Noi
Ramkhamhaeng.29
Wat Thepleela - Soi Ram Khamheang 39
Ramkhamhaeng.U - Opposite Ramkhamhaeng University.
Mahadthai - near Rajamangala National Stadium and Indoor Stadium Huamark.
Wat Klang
The Mall Bangkapi - The Mall Bangkapi on Lat Phrao Road.
Bangkapi - Bang Kapi district office and market.
Wat Sriboonreung - terminal pier, near NIDA.

References

External links

bangkokpost.com - Bangkok Post article

Water transport in Bangkok
Water taxis